The 1970 Oklahoma State Cowboys football team represented Oklahoma State University in the Big Eight Conference during the 1970 NCAA University Division football season. In their second season under head coach Floyd Gass, the Cowboys compiled a 4–7 record (2–5 against conference opponents), tied for sixth place in the conference, and were outscored by opponents by a combined total of 337 to 215.

The team's statistical leaders included Bobby Cole with 685 rushing yards, Tony Pounds with 1,871 passing yards, and Hermann Eben with 937 receiving yards and 42 points scored.

The team played its home games at Lewis Field in Stillwater, Oklahoma.

Schedule

After the season

The 1971 NFL Draft was held on January 28–29, 1971. The following Cowboy was selected.

References

Oklahoma State
Oklahoma State Cowboys football seasons
Oklahoma State Cowboys football